Meadows is a town in the Canadian province of Newfoundland and Labrador. The town had a population of 404 in the Canada 2021 Census. The town has a senior citizen's complex, a convenience store/take-out, and the North Shore's only school, Templeton Academy, a k-12 school. It also has its own water supply, and provides water for the neighbouring town of Gilliams.

Demographics 

See also
 List of cities and towns in Newfoundland and Labrador

References 

Towns in Newfoundland and Labrador